"Instinct" is a 1996 song by rock group Crowded House. It was the first single released from the group's greatest hits compilation Recurring Dream in the United Kingdom, and the third and final release in Australia. It was a top-20 hit in New Zealand and the UK, peaking at number 17 and number 12, respectively. In Australia, "Instinct" peaked at number 90 on the ARIA Singles Chart in March 1997, spending two non-consecutive weeks in the top 100.

The band members reportedly hated the music video for the song which featured two female aliens, and a living golden statue, thus it was omitted from the compilation DVD Dreaming: The Videos.

Track listings
"Instinct" was released as a two CD set available separately. Disc one in a double case; disc two in a sleeve ready to insert the disc into the case with disc one. "Recurring Dream" originally from the film Tequila Sunrise and later released on Crowded House rarities album Afterglow. "In the Lowlands" originally from Temple of Low Men. "Chocolate Cake" features The Beatles song "Rocky Raccoon" as its intro. All songs written by Neil Finn unless otherwise indicated.

UK CD1
 "Instinct"
 "Recurring Dream" (Remix from Tequila Sunrise soundtrack) (Craig Hooper, Neil Finn, Nick Seymour, Paul Hester)
 "Weather with You" (N. Finn, Tim Finn) (live)
 "Chocolate Cake" ("Rocky Raccoon": John Lennon, Paul McCartney; "Chocolate Cake": N. Finn, T. Finn) (live)

UK CD2
 "Instinct" (alternative mix)
 "World Where You Live" (live)
 "In the Lowlands" (live)
 "Into Temptation" (live)

Charts

References

Crowded House songs
1996 singles
1996 songs
Capitol Records singles
Songs written by Mitchell Froom
Songs written by Neil Finn